Malla is a Spanish and Nepalese surname that may refer to:
Spanish
Ceferino Giménez Malla (1861–1936), Spanish Roman Catholic catechist 
Coque Malla (born 1970), Spanish musician and actor 
Felip de Malla (1370–1431), Catalan prelate, theologian and scholar
Ramon Malla Call (1922–2014), Andorran Bishop 

Nepalese/Indian
Malla (Nepal), a royal dynasty, see List of Malla Kings of Nepal for members 
Ashesh Malla (born 1954), Nepalese playwright and theatre director
Bikash Malla (born 1986), Nepalese footballer
Chandra Kanta Devi Malla, Nepalese activist and teacher
Durga Malla (1913–1944), Indian soldier
Gauri Malla, Nepalese actress
Gyanendra Malla (born 1990), Nepalese cricketer
Hem Bahadur Malla, Nepalese minister
Jagat Sundar Malla (1882–1952), Nepalese teacher and writer
Jayanta Malla Baruah, Indian politician 
Kali Bahadur Malla, Nepalese politician
Kamal P. Malla, Nepalese academic
Narasingha Malla Deb (1907–1976), Indian politician
Sampada Malla, Nepalese media personality, writer, film maker and journalist 
Sapana Pradhan Malla, Nepalese Supreme Court Judge 
Saugat Malla, Nepalese film actor
Sharmila Malla, Nepalese actress 
Suresh Malla, Nepalese politician
Tilak Bam Malla, better known as Parivesh, Nepalese singer
 Thirbam Malla, Nepalese democracy activist
Other
Nissanka Malla of Polonnaruwa, 12th century king of Sri Lanka 
Florentina Mallá (1891–1973), Czech composer and pianist 
Jihan Malla, Lebanese television personality and voice actress
Pasha Malla, Canadian author

Spanish-language surnames
Nepali-language surnames
Khas surnames